Anton Ivakin (born 3 February 1991) is a Russian athlete, pole vaulter.

With a personal best of 5.40 m (Cheboksary 3 July 2010), he is the new World Champion Junior in Moncton with a mark of 5.50 m (WJL), defeating Claudio Stecchi from Italy.

Achievements

External links

1991 births
Living people
Russian male pole vaulters